John Edward "Ed" Decker (born 1935) is an American counterculture apologist, and evangelist known for his expert studies, books, and public presentations, of the negative aspects of the Church of Jesus Christ of Latter-day Saints (LDS religion) and Freemasonry. He is a former member of the LDS Church, and prominent early member of a Christian group for ex-Mormons called Saints Alive in Jesus. His most well-known book is The God Makers: A Shocking Expose of What the Mormon Church Really Believes, co-authored by Dave Hunt.

Biography
Decker was born to a Jewish mother and Dutch father of the Reformed Christian faith (Calvinist) but raised an Episcopalian. While attending Utah State University, he married a Latter-day Saint student named Phyllis and converted to Mormonism. They later married in the Presbyterian Church on June 10, 1956.

They were divorced in 1969. Decker married again and has been married for 50 years, and has 8 children, 10 grandchildren, and 7 great-grandchildren. He is currently a pastor in Palm Desert, CA.

Writings on Mormonism
Decker has authored and coauthored, books addressing the inner workings and negative aspects of the LDS religion. His book, The God Makers, was followed by The God Makers II. He released a book in November 2007, titled My Kingdom Come: The Mormon Quest for Godhood.

Additional books written in this genre, include Fast Facts on False Teachings, Decker's Complete Handbook on Mormonism, and Unmasking Mormonism. A fictional work by Decker, entitled The Mormon Dilemma was added to Conversations With The Cults—The Harvest House series, entitled What You Need to Know About Mormons.

He participated in the documentary films The God Makers, The Temple of the God Makers, The Mormon Dilemma, and The God Makers II. His smaller projects include the booklets "And The Word Became Flesh", "To Moroni, With Love!", and "Understanding Islam", which are distributed by his nonprofit organization.

Criticism 
Decker's work has attracted criticism not only from Latter-day Saints, but from others outside the faith. Jerald and Sandra Tanner, two prominent critics of the LDS Church, and Robert Passantino have said that Decker's writings grossly misrepresent Mormonism, and thereby dilute his message and offend Mormons without attracting them to evangelical Christianity. The Tanners have noted what they contend are inaccuracies and errors in some of Decker's works. 
 
One of Decker's associates offered to exorcise the Tanners' demons, and expressed great sadness when they refused.

Works

Books
 The God Makers: A Shocking Expose of What the Mormon Church Really Believes, avec Dave Hunt, Harvest House Publishers, 1997,  
 The God Makers II
 My Kingdom Come – The Mormon Quest for Godhood, 2007
 Fast Facts on False Teachings
 Decker's Complete Handbook on Mormonism
 Unmasking Mormonism
 The Mormon Dilemma
 What You Need to Know About Mormons
 What You Need To Know About Masons
 The Dark Side of Freemasonry, Huntington House Publishers, 1994.
 Hotel Hope Kindle
 Crescent Moon Rising: The Islamic Invasion of America,

Movies
 The God Makers
 The Temple Of The God Makers
 The Mormon Dilemma
 The God Makers II
Leaflets
 And The Word Became Flesh
 To Moroni, With Love! 
 The Question of Freemasonry

See also
Anti-Mormonism

References

External links
FAIR – Mormon/LDS site index for topics relating to Ed Decker
Profile of Ed Decker
Saints Alive Ministry – Decker's ministry

1935 births
American Christian writers
American evangelicals
Anti-Masonry
Converts to Mormonism from Anglicanism
Critics of Mormonism
Date of birth missing (living people)
Former Latter Day Saints
Living people
People excommunicated by the Church of Jesus Christ of Latter-day Saints
Place of birth missing (living people)
Utah State University alumni